Géomorphologie: Relief, Processus, Environnement is a quarterly peer-reviewed scientific journal covering research on geomorphology and allied disciplines such as archaeology, physical geography, ecology and other Earth sciences.

External links

Geomorphology journals
Multilingual journals